Worcester Kings were an American soccer team, founded in 2002, who were members of the United Soccer Leagues Premier Development League (PDL), the fourth tier of the American Soccer Pyramid, until 2003, after which the team left the league and the franchise was terminated.

The Kings played their home games at the John Coughlin Memorial Field on the campus of Worcester State College in the city of Worcester, Massachusetts.

Year-by-year

Competition history

Stadia
 John Coughlin Memorial Field, Worcester, Massachusetts 2003

References

2002 establishments in Massachusetts
2003 disestablishments in Massachusetts
Association football clubs established in 2002
Association football clubs disestablished in 2003
Defunct Premier Development League teams
Defunct soccer clubs in Massachusetts
Sports teams in Worcester, Massachusetts
Worcester State University